The Christine Keeler Story, also known as The Keeler Affair and The Christine Keeler Affair, is a 1963 film about the Profumo affair.

Cast
Yvonne Buckingham as Christine Keeler
John Drew Barrymore as Dr. Stephen Ward
Alicia Brandet as Mandy Rice-Davies
Mel Welles as Yevgeni Ivanovich
Peter Prowse as Domaren
Mimi Heinrich as Marianne
Christine Keeler as herself
Mandy Rice-Davies as herself

Production
The film was shot in Denmark over six weeks.

Photo

To promote the film, photographer Lewis Morley took a photo of Keeler sitting on a chair on the first floor of Peter Cook's Establishment Club, with implied nudity. Though the film was never released, the photo was published in the Sunday Mirror and has since become very famous.

Release
The film was twice rejected by the British Board of Film Censors (BBFC) in 1963 and 1969, and the second time was also rejected by the Greater London Council. It was never released in the UK, banned in New Zealand, and shown in Australia only after being edited. These factors, combined with the BBFC rejection, substantially limited its exposure and profitability.

The Blackpool Tribune, reviewing the film in Boston, called it "a filmic equivalent to a sex comic."

In 1971 the film was screened in London at the New Cinema Club by Derek Hill as an act of defiance against the censor. Derek Malcolm of The Guardian said "it was scarcely worth seeing even as a curiosity, a fact that Mr Hill openly admits".

References

External links
The Christine Keeler Story at IMDb

1963 films
British drama films
Films shot in Denmark
1960s British films